Lange Linschoten is a hamlet in the Dutch province of Utrecht. It is a part of the municipality of Oudewater, and lies about 2 km northeast of the city of Oudewater.

The hamlet was first mentioned in 1555 as Lange Lynschoten, and means "the long part of the Linschoten (river)". It is not a statistical entity, and the postal authorities have placed it under Snelrewaard. In 1840, Lange Linschoten was home to 144 people. Nowadays, it consists of about 120 houses.

Gallery

References

Populated places in Utrecht (province)
Oudewater